Zhastalap (Jastalap, جاستالاپ), previously Gangyushkino (Gangyushkino),  is a town in Atyrau Region, southwest Kazakhstan.

References

Atyrau Region
Cities and towns in Kazakhstan